Holwell is a village and civil parish in the county of Dorset in southern England, situated approximately  south-east of Sherborne. It is sited on Oxford clay in the Blackmore Vale. Its name derives from the Old English hol and walu, meaning a bank or ridge in a hollow. The parish includes the hamlets of Sandhills, Westrow, Barnes Cross, The Borough, and Woodbridge. In the 2011 census the parish had a population of 369 and is part of the Cam Vale electoral ward. Until 1844 Holwell was an exclave of Somerset, being part of the parish of Milborne Port.

Holwell parish church is situated with a few houses at the end of a cul-de-sac in a small settlement called The Borough. This is the original medieval part of the village, sited next to the Caundle Brook in the north of the parish. Secondary settlements were established later to the south, east and west; these were outside The Borough's open field system and had their own enclosures. The most southerly part of the parish was enclosed in 1797. The church, dedicated to St Lawrence, largely dates from the late 15th century, though it was restored in 1885. The biblical scholar Henry Adeney Redpath was rector at Holwell between 1883 and 1890.

A short distance north of the church the Caundle Brook is crossed by a packhorse bridge, probably of medieval origin. About  to the west and also crossing the Caundle Brook is Cornford Bridge, dating from the 15th and 18th centuries and designated a grade II* listed building and a scheduled monument.

At Barnes Cross—between The Borough and Cornford Bridge—is a pillar box which is the oldest still in everyday use in Britain. It is hexagonal with a vertical letter slot and was made between 1853 and 1856 by the Gloucester firm John N. Butt & Co. It is also grade II* listed.

Notes

External links

Villages in Dorset
Places formerly in Somerset